Opel OHC engine can refer to the following diesel and petrol engines produced by General Motors:

 Family 0 - straight-4 engines produced by Adam Opel AG.
 Family 1 - straight-4 engines produced by Adam Opel AG.
 Family II - straight-4 engines produced by Adam Opel AG.